Kyle Barri Duncan (born August 8, 1997) is an American professional soccer player who plays as a right-back for Major League Soccer club New York Red Bulls, on loan from Oostende. He is a cousin of fellow professional soccer player Timothy Weah.

Career

Youth

Born in Brooklyn, New York, Duncan began his career in the New York Red Bulls Academy. On August 6, 2014, Duncan played with the Red Bulls reserve team against United Soccer League team Harrisburg City Islanders, and he started all 13 games in the Red Bulls under-18s 2014 fall season. Duncan declined a professional contract with New York Red Bulls II in 2015, instead pursuing opportunities in Europe.

Valenciennes
In October 2015, Duncan signed a two-year contract with Ligue 2 side Valenciennes. During his first season at the club, he played for Valenciennes II in Championnat National 3, making his debut on May 14, 2016 starting at right back in a 2–1 loss to Olympique Noisy-le-Sec. Duncan was promoted to the first team for the 2016–17 season, but did not make any appearances in Ligue 2.

New York Red Bulls
After two seasons with Valenciennes, Duncan returned to the US for pre-season training with the Red Bulls in January 2018. The Red Bulls announced on March 9, 2018 that they had signed Duncan to a Major League Soccer contract due to his "attitude and work ethic during preseason." He started in the Red Bulls' MLS season opener against Portland Timbers the next day; television commentator Jonathan Yardley described Duncan as "dominating" and that he "totally manhandled" his experienced direct opponent, Sebastián Blanco, in the 4–0 win.

On March 15, 2018, the New York Red Bulls entered into a loan agreement with New York Red Bulls II, and Duncan was listed on the Red Bulls II 2018 USL season roster. However, he started his second MLS game with New York Red Bulls two days later, against Real Salt Lake. Duncan earned his first MLS assist against Minnesota United on March 24, 2018. His season was cut short due to an ACL injury suffered against Orlando City SC on March 31, 2018.

After not featuring regularly for the first team, Duncan was loaned to New York Red Bulls II during the 2019 season. On August 21, 2019 he scored his first goal as a professional in 2–1 victory over Nashville SC at First Tennessee Park. After a few impressive performances with the second team he was recalled to the first team. On September 19, 2019, Duncan scored his first MLS goal in a 2–0 victory over Portland Timbers at Providence Park.

Duncan began the 2020 campaign as a starter for New York. On March 1, he opened the season for New York scoring the first goal of the season and assisting on two others in a 3–2 victory over FC Cincinnati. On August 20, 2020, Duncan scored the loan goal for Red Bulls in a 1-0 victory over rival New York City FC  in the Hudson River Derby. On October 24, 2020, Duncan opened the scoring for New York in a 2-2 draw with Chicago Fire FC at Soldier Field.  On December 21, 2020, Duncan was named New York Red Bulls Defensive Player of the Year for the 2020 season.

On June 18, 2021, Duncan helped New York to a 2-0 victory over Nashville SC, scoring his lone goal of the season.  He ended the 2021 season as one of New Yorks' top performers, appearing in 33 matches scoring one goal and providing three assists.

Oostende
On November 26, 2021, Duncan joined Belgian club Oostende on a free transfer. On January 21, 2022, Duncan was in the starting 11 on his debut during a 2–1 loss against Antwerp. Duncan played the entire match as a right wing-back. On February 19, 2022, Duncan played 73 minutes for Oostende in a 1-0 famous victory over Standard Liège. Duncan ended his first season in Belgium appearing in 7 matches, all as a starter.

Loan return to New York Red Bulls
On August 5, 2022, it was announced that Duncan would be returning to New York Red Bulls on loan until the end of the 2022 season. On January 15, 2023, Duncan was once again sent on loan to Red Bulls for the 2023 MLS season

International career
Duncan has represented the United States at the under-18, under-20, and senior levels. Duncan made his senior national team debut on December 9, 2020, being substituted for Julián Araujo in the 74th minute of a 6-0 friendly victory versus El Salvador.

Career statistics

Club

International

Honors
New York Red Bulls
MLS Supporters' Shield: 2018

Individual
New York Red Bulls Defensive Player of the Year: 2020

References

External links
 
 
Profile at proleague.be

1997 births
Sportspeople from Brooklyn
Soccer players from New York City
Living people
African-American soccer players
American soccer players
American sportspeople of Jamaican descent
Association football defenders
Valenciennes FC players
New York Red Bulls players
New York Red Bulls II players
K.V. Oostende players
USL Championship players
Major League Soccer players
Belgian Pro League players
American expatriate soccer players
Expatriate footballers in France
American expatriate sportspeople in France
Expatriate footballers in Belgium
American expatriate sportspeople in Belgium